A reticular cell is a type of fibroblast that synthesizes collagen alpha-1(III) and uses it to produce reticular fibers. The cell surrounds the fibers with its cytoplasm, isolating them from other tissue components and cells. Reticular cells provide structural support, since they produce and maintain the thin networks of fibers that are a framework for most lymphoid organs.

Reticular cells are found in many organs, including the spleen, lymph nodes and kidneys. They are also found within tissues, such as lymph nodules. There are different types of reticular cells, including epithelial, mesenchymal, and fibroblastic reticular cells. Fibroblastic reticular cells are involved in directing B cells and T cells to specific regions within the tissue whereas epithelial and mesenchymal reticular cells are associated with certain areas of the brain.

See also 
List of human cell types derived from the germ layers

References 
2.  Schat, K. A., Kaspers, B., & Kaiser, P. (2014). Structure of the Avian Lymphoid System. In I. Olah, N. Nagy & L. Vervelde (Eds.), Avian Immunology (2nd ed., pp. 11-44). Academic Press.

Cell biology